Hamish Bain (born 24 September 1997) is a Scotland Club XV international rugby union player, currently playing for Pro14 side Glasgow Warriors. His preferred position is lock.

Rugby Union career

Amateur career

Bain has played for Currie in the Tennents Premiership. He was enrolled in the Scottish Rugby Academy in 2015 as a Stage 1 player and moved to Stage 2 in 2016.

Bain spent two seasons at Stade Niçois from 2018 to 2020, through a partnership with Scottish Rugby.

Professional career

As part of the Scottish Rugby Academy Bain was assigned to Edinburgh Rugby as a Stage 3 player in September 2017.

Bain signed for Glasgow Warriors in July 2020. He made his Glasgow Warriors debut in Round 3 of the 2020–21 Pro14 against Ospreys.

International career

Bain has played for Scotland U20s. He has also represented the Scotland Club XV international side, playing against the U20 side.

References

External links
itsrugby.co.uk Profile

1997 births
Living people
Scottish rugby union players
Glasgow Warriors players
Rugby union locks
Rugby union players from Edinburgh
Scotland Club XV international rugby union players
Currie RFC players
Stade Niçois players
Portobello RFC players
Jersey Reds players
Scottish expatriate rugby union players
Scottish expatriate sportspeople in France
Expatriate rugby union players in France